List of English football transfers 2006–07 may refer to:

List of English football transfers summer 2006
List of English football transfers winter 2006–07
List of English football transfers summer 2007

Transfers
2006